Cardis may refer to
Cardis (name)
Kärde, a village in Estonia
Treaty of Cardis, which ended a Russo–Swedish War in 1661
Japanese thrush (Turdus cardis)